NPPA: is an Egyptian public economic authority of a special nature affiliated to the Ministry of Electricity and Renewable Energy

Establishment 
NPPA was established pursuant to Law No. (13) of 1976, as amended by Law No. (210) of 2017,

as a public economic authority of a special nature, affiliated to the Ministry of Electricity and Renewable Energy,

and is the only authority competent to establish, operate and manage nuclear power plants in the Arab Republic of Egypt.

The main headquarters of NPPA is located in Cairo. NPPA possesses national capabilities,

including with respect to the scientific qualifications and accumulated expertise necessary

for achieving the duties assigned to it  in relation to the management,

operation and maintenance of nuclear power plants in the Arab Republic of Egypt (ARE).

Mission 

 NPPA is competent to carry out the following duties: ·  Implementing and managing nuclear power plant projects.  ·  Concluding agreements with similar local and international entities.  ·  Preparing and qualifying human resources locally and internationally.  ·  Establishing nuclear power plants to generate electricity and desalinate water.  ·  Conducting the necessary researches and studies, which are necessary for the construction of nuclear power projects.  ·  Establishing the basis for the specifications related to the construction of nuclear power plant projects.

Organizational structure

The Egyptian Nuclear Program
Egypt was one of the first countries that became cognizant of the importance of using nuclear energy in electricity generation and sea water desalination  in the early fifties of the last century, so as to contribute to optimising the benefits of Egypt's primary energy and fresh water resources as follows:

· Diversifying sources of electricity generation.

· Developing and upgrading local industry to meet international standards along with the transfer and localisation of technology.

· Placing Egypt as a leading country in the Middle East and Africa among developed countries, especially in areas

related to the peaceful uses of nuclear energy.

· Preserving energy resources, such as petroleum and natural gas, which are depleted and non-renewable resources.  

Therefore, they must be consumed diligently so as to not deprive future generations of important resources for sustainable and independent development.

· Optimising the added value of petroleum and natural gas use as an indispensable raw material in petrochemical industries,

as well  as their use in fertilizers and transportation instead of consuming them to generate electricity.

· Reducing the rates of petroleum products importation for all uses, which are increasing on a yearly basis despite the extended

use of natural gas, in respect of which Egypt has become a net importer in recent years.

El-Dabaa Nuclear Power Plant Project 

The substantial efforts made by Egypt and its governments throughout many years in seeking to enter the nuclear field resulted in signaling  the commencement of the construction of the El-Dabaa NPP. It is planned to build four Russian VVER reactors with a capacity of 1200 MW each (AES-2006). It is worth mentioning that this reactor belongs to the category of pressurized water reactors (advanced third generation reactors GEN 3+), which are currently among the most advanced reactors in the world.

The project is currently being implemented at the El-Dabaa site which is located 150 km west of Alexandria on the Mediterranean coast, in the north of the Arab Republic of Egypt (ARE). Multiple contracts have been concluded between the NPPA and Rosatom as the main contractor for the project, including the Engineering, Procurement and Construction contract, Nuclear Fuel Supply contract, Operation Support and Maintenance contract, as well as the Spent Nuclear Fuel contract.

Stages of Implementation of the El-Dabaa NPP

First Stage 
The preparatory stage began in December 2017 and lasted about two and a half years,

aimed at preparing the site for the construction works.

It is worth noting that the El-Dabaa NPP project was chosen as one of the best 3 nuclear projects in terms of launching, on the sidelines of the eleventh edition of “Rosatom Expo 2019”, the largest nuclear conference and exhibition in the world which was held in Sochi. and marked the first time that a nuclear project in the Middle East was granted this award.

Second Stage 
The construction stage, which is the current project stage and which commenced following the obtainment of the construction permit for unit 1 from the Egyptian Nuclear and Radiological Regulatory Authority (ENRRA).on 29 June 2022, and includes all works related to building, constructing, training NPPA personnel, and preparing to carry out operational tests.

Third Stage 
This is the final stage after obtaining the pre-commissioning testing permit, and includes commissioning works and the commencement of  actual operation until the provisional take-over of the first unit and the issuance of the operating license.

The progress of the project implementation is contingent upon  the issuance of licenses, as their issuance confirms the compliance with all requirements related to the safety and security of the nuclear power plant.

Accordingly, NPPA is keen to obtain all required licenses and permits related to the site, the reactor design, the construction, commissioning testing and commercial operation.

Milestones 
The Arab Republic of Egypt has undertaken many actions, procedures and activities to enhance and prepare its nuclear infrastructure to be able implement and operat NPP projects efficiently, safely and reliably. The following table shows the milestones achieved with respect the Egyptian nuclear program  in order to establish a NPP.

Choosing Rosatom  
The Russian Federation is currently one of the largest exporters of nuclear reactors and currently has nuclear power plant projects under construction in Bangladesh, Belarus, Hungary, China, India and Turkey. Rosatom has also has accumulated experience in the field of nuclear power plant construction and operation, as it has supplied many nuclear power plants currently in operation, totaling to (96) reactors of various Russian models which operate efficiently in (14) countries.

Impact of the El-Dabaa Nuclear Power Plant Project 
The implementation of the nuclear power project has many positive effects on the following:

The i construction, operation and maintenance of nuclear power plants will require thousands of highly skilled personnel at different professional levels, which will contribute to reducing the unemployment rate, in addition to the following key advantages:

  Around 5000-6000 people participate in the construction works of the nuclear power plant over a period of 6 consecutive years per unit. The construction works of all 4 units would last for about 10 years.
  About 1,000 people participate in the operation and maintenance of one unit. The aggregate number of persons involved in the operation of all 4 units would reach 4,000 people over the operational life of the nuclear plant which is 60 years.
 Providing job opportunities in complementary and auxiliary industries and workshops.
 The nuclear power plant project will contribute to  elevating the quality standards of local industry in line with the required standards specific to nuclear industries. This will necessarily lead to a significant boom in the capabilities of the local industry and its competitiveness in the local and global market.
 The use of nuclear energy power plants for electricity generation will reduce the consumption rates of natural gas and oil,  and allow for their usage in petrochemical industries raising their added value.
 The electricity produced from nuclear power plants will reduce the number of subsidies provided by the government for the supply of electricity to consumers..
  Achieving the local participation rate of at least 20% for the first unit, which gradually increases with the number of units so as to reach 35% for the fourth unit.

Achievements 
The El-Dabaa NPP project was chosen as one of the 3 best nuclear projects in terms of launch in the eleventh edition  of the largest nuclear conference and exhibition in the world «Rosatom Expo», which was held in Sochi, Russia. This award is the first of its kind to be awarded to a nuclear project located in the Middle East.

The award commemorates Egypt's efforts to agree the best technical specifications and conditions upon which the contracts were concluded with the Russian partner implementing the nuclear power plant project in El-Dabaa.

As part of the continuous outstanding achievements of the NPPA  under the leadership of its Board Chairman,

Prof. Dr. Amgad Al-Wakeel , the El-Dabaa Nuclear Power Plant project team won the Government Excellence Award for the best  national team . The award was received by Eng. Mohamed Ramadan, Vice Board Chairman for Operation and Maintenance.

See also 
 Boiling water reactor
 Energy law
 Nuclear Energy Agency
 Nuclear reactor safety system
 Nuclear technology
 Pressurized water reactor

References 

Energy in Egypt
Nuclear program of Egypt
Government agencies of Egypt